Phạm Quang Khiêm (born December 27, 1946) was a first lieutenant and co-pilot in the South Vietnam Air Force (VNAF) during the Vietnam War. Khiêm was a cargo pilot with the 53rd Tactical Wing of the 5th Air Division stationed at Tan Son Nhut. He flew several missions into communist-occupied Pleiku to rescue VNAF personnel. On 3 April 1975, Khiêm organized a plan to steal a C-130a and gather 53 people to rescue them from the North Vietnamese communists. Later, Khiêm became pilot for Piedmont Airlines until 2006.

Early life

Phạm Quang Khiêm was born on December 27, 1946, in Vĩnh-Long, Vietnam. Khiêm had nine siblings and all of his brothers were in the military.  Khiêm had three children: two in South Vietnam and one in the United States of America.

Early career

In November 1969, Khiêm went to Lackland AFB to learn English as a cadet. At Randolph AFB, he earned his basic pilot training, then moved on to Keesler AFB, where he flew the T-28 Trojan. Khiêm also trained at Lockbourne AFB from October–December 1970. Eventually, he was assigned to fly pilot-in-command of C-123K aircraft before moving up to the 53rd Tactical Wing, 435th Transport Squadron as a C-130A pilot.

Hard Landing

On January 24, 1971, Phạm Quang Khiêm nearly died almost ending his flight career before it started. After a year of training in the states, Khiêm was sent to Phan-Rang AFB by the VNAF to start "In Country Training" with the USAF on a C-123K. Khiêm was assigned to fly with 1LT. Minh and their American Instructor, Cpt. John Mastronardi. Minh was the Aircraft Commander in the left seat and in the right, Khiêm switched with Captain Mastronardi to execute co-pilot duties. One day, they had an assignment to transfer 48 M107 175 mm bullet heads from Bien-Hoa Air Base to a US FSB 113 kilometers north near the Cambodian border. They had to land in an isolated area for a safe distance from any airport facilities since they carried high explosive material. They landed on the short dirt strip, Bù Gia Mập Air Strip (aka Djamap). The runway was 3000' on top of a 1620' hill. Co-Pilots (in this training) weren't allowed to make any landing on any runway shorter than 3600'. Minh was supposed to handle this flight, but Captain Mastronardi kept Khiêm in the right seat, believing he could handle the landing after previous successful landings. Khiêm was a young pilot and didn't know the difference between a short runway and a long one. It was a hostile area, so they had to come in high and drop fast. They came down to 2000' at 78 knots and when the C-123K was about 20 feet in the air crossing the end of the runway Khiêm decided to cut the power to idle causing the aircraft to drop touching down extremely hard. The left main landing gear fell into the belly wrecking the wheel and scratched all the red dirt on the runway skyrocketing into the cockpit. Khiêm and Minh were blinded. Captain Mastronardi immediately reversed the right engine, bringing the aircraft back, stopping the aircraft. If Captain Mastronardi had not stopped the plane, the whole aircraft might have run off the dirt strip, dropping hundreds of yards exploding down the hill.

End of the War 
At the end of March 1975, the North Vietnamese had already taken half of South Vietnam. Citizens were fleeing as well as soldiers creating chaos throughout the country. Both civilians and officers were hitching military aircraft to escape the North Vietnamese. At the end of March 1975, the NVA was pushing towards the coast to strike Qui Nhơn, Tuy Hòa, and Nha Trang.

Pleiku 

 In the north of South Vietnam, the only remaining government enclave was Da Nang. Khiêm flew three missions into and out of Pleiku, evacuating the families of VNAF personnel. The people of Pleiku learned of the evacuation and stormed the airport forcing five C-130's en route from Saigon to turn around before their airlifts were complete. Some C-130's flew bombing missions to destroy the aircraft left behind. They were loaded with 55-gallon drums of napalm, then dropped on VNAF aircraft abandoned on the ramps.

Da Nang 
28 March 1975, Khiêm flew one of the last missions to Da Nang at 11:00 pm, the night before its loss. When he landed and taxied to the ramp, an ARVN major jumped into the aircraft to get a seat. Khiêm knew that the thousands of people would rush the airplane after seeing the major, so Khiêm kicked him off. Khiêm was a First Lieutenant, and the aircraft commander was searching the terminal for his family. But, the ramp was filled with refugees almost immediately anyway. Around 20,000 pounds of cargo on board, so Khiêm yelled at them to offload first. The crowd was too chaotic, so Khiêm told the loadmaster to do unloading and loading through the ramp in the back of the C-130. Once finished, people rushed onto the aircraft. Khiêm started the engines, scattering many, allowing Khiêm to taxi out.

As they taxied, the Loadmaster yelled at Khiêm through the intercom saying he couldn't close the ramp because people were on it. Khiêm hit the brakes jamming the refugees in tight-allowing the ramp to close. At the end of the runway, an MP (Military Police) in a truck had his family in it, blocking the taxiway and pointing his M-16 at the cockpit.  He motioned to let his family on board. Khiêm motioned him to move the truck so he could line up on the runway. Khiêm backed up, lined up, and took off without the MP. Khiêm offloaded at Tan Son Nhut and did a headcount of 350 people. C-130's are maximized to carry 128 passengers, but Khiêm fit almost three times that amount.

 That mission was the turning point for Khiêm. He knew if the chaos reaches Saigon, he had to get his family out of Vietnam for good.

Nha Trang
31 March 1975, Khiêm flew several missions in the evacuation of Nha Trang. The following day, Qui Nhơn, South Vietnam's third-largest city was captured by the North Vietnamese. The next target for the North Vietnamese was Nha Trang. Khiêm just made it just like he did in Da Nang.

Flight to freedom
2 April 1975, Khiêm caught a ride on a C-130 "bladder bird" into Phan Rang, in hopes to pinpoint his younger brother, who was an airman there. Khiêm wanted to take him back to Saigon to be with the rest of their family. Khiêm couldn't find him, so left without him. On the way back to Saigon, Khiêm thought if Phan Rang is lost, then the communists will come to Saigon. Khiêm started to devise a plan to escape South Vietnam with his family. Khiêm heard that Singapore was looking for pilots so that was where he would go. VNAF Pilots started talking about stealing planes with their families; so, Command ordered the men to fuel the aircraft only enough to complete their missions. This created a major problem for Khiêm. Another was finding someone to help a family escape.

Preparation
One of Khiêm's close friends was Major Nguyen Canh Huu in the South Vietnam Air Force and he was in Khiêm's sister squadron the 437th Squadron. They discussed the escape and Khiêm told him they must be the first otherwise there wouldn't be a second. Major Canh's family was in Da Lat, and he wanted to get them to Saigon before leaving. On 2 April, Da Lat was overrun by the communists and Nguyen lost contact with them. After that, he was prepared to escape. On 3 April, all the C-130s were used on bombing missions and Khiêm was number one standby for the mission planning board, but Khiêm needed to tell his family his plan to escape. Khiêm told an officer he didn't feel good and agreed to drop Khiêm to the bottom of the list. Khiêm ran home and told one of his brothers to keep his family close to home because they were all gathered in Saigon. Khiêm told his family to rush to the Long Thanh Airfield (known by the US as Bearcat Base) as soon as they heard from him. Long Thanh was originally a US Army airbase that Khiěm had landed many times in training. It was closed and deserted since the US withdrawal in 1973.

Khiêm's house was a mile from the airport and ran home and told his family to leave. But there was a hindrance, Khiêm and Nguyen were in different squadrons, and would not usually fly together. Khiêm could not even get into the squadron area because the guards did not know him. But the airplane Khiêm was supposed to escape with had mechanical problems, and the 437th had to borrow the 435th's C-130a HCF 460, nickname "Saigon Lady", and would let Khiêm in the area. Now Khiêm had to get rid of Canh's co-pilot. The co-pilot let Khiêm fly gladly because he wanted the rest of the day off to prepare for his date.

Now the biggest problem left of all: the fuel. Khiêm thought they would only have enough fuel to maybe make it to Thailand. Khiêm checked the fuel to find out the entire tank was full. The man fueling the tank took a smoke break and filled the tank all the way. This full tank of gas meant Singapore was possible.

Lt. Khiêm, Major Canh, and the rest of the crew (not knowing where they were going) were prepared for takeoff. Khiêm took off without clearance and turned southeast instead of east. Khiêm told the crew on the intercom that they were redirected to Long Thanh instead of Phan Rang. They landed safely, then the Loadmaster opened the ramp unloading 20,000 lbs of dry rice. Khiêm's brother in Phan Rang made it to their parent's house in Saigon a few minutes before the escape. While Khiêm's family and friends of 53 people boarded, he told the crew that he was escaping Vietnam and they could come if they wanted. The Flight Engineer got up, then sat back down and said he would come. The number one Loadmaster thought Khiêm and Canh were defecting to the North Vietnamese. He served in the VNAF for ten years and ran away as fast as he could. The other Loadmaster was on his first C-130 training ride and had no clue as to what was going on, so he just stood next to the open ramp.

Escape
Khiêm started taxiing away, but when everyone boarded the plane with their luggage, Khiêm's two-year-old daughter was trampled and knocked out with blood everywhere. Khiêm's wife, Ngoc-My, saw her thinking she was dead and passed out dropping their infant child on the ground. The infant child was left on the tarmac as Khiêm started to taxi but, luckily, Khiêm's oldest brother's wife ran out and grabbed the infant and ran back into the moving C-130A (all of them recovered after). As Khiêm started taxiing to the takeoff end of the runway, Khiêm saw the Loadmaster speaking to many ARVN soldiers who came in a jeep. As Khiêm and Canh turned to take off, the Jeep came and pointed an M-79 grenade launcher at the cockpit. Khiêm took off anyway knowing they wouldn't fire. The ramp was still open, so Khiêm ran back and told the puzzled, inexperienced Loadmaster to hold the switch until the ramp was up, then Khiêm ran to the cockpit just in time to raise the gear. The period from Khiêm landing to Khiêm and the passengers leaving was only seven minutes.

Shallow flying
Khiêm and Canh flew at treetop level until they reached the sea, then they dropped down to the sea-level. It got very humid in the back resulting in a thick fog forming. Khiêm's family and friends could not see each other because the fog was too thick. One hour later, they raised to 16,000 feet and flew straight to Singapore.

Singapore

They arrived in Singapore at around 7:00 PM. Khiêm called Approach Control for instructions but could not understand them, so he changed to Tower Frequency, and requested landing instruction. Yet, the call was intercepted by the Singapore Air Force. Khiêm told the other end of the line that the C-130A was off course and running out of fuel. So, they allowed Khiêm to land on runway 02. They all stayed put until the authorities came so they could seek political asylum.

The officials had no clue what to do with them. Singapore Prime Minister Lee Kuan Yew was out of the country for another two weeks. The Singapore Air Defense Command (SADC) was just renamed and reconstructed into the Republic of Singapore Air Force (RSAF) on 1 April 1975, just two days before Khiêm arrived.

Khiêm proposed for them to leave Singapore and go to Australia so Singapore wouldn't have to deal with them. They agreed, but only if they would pay for gas. They only accepted U.S. Currency and all the passengers had a combined total of around $100–400. Khiêm tried to bribe with jewelry, but they would not accept. The group was moved in separate prison trucks to a detention center outside Singapore. Khiêm and the others were released until the Fall of Saigon.

Saipan
After spending three weeks in jail, they were all flown to Saipan in a deluxe hotel. After a week there, they finally learned that the Republic of Vietnam (South Vietnam) had fallen to the northern communists.

The United States of America
Khiêm and his family ended up at Camp Pendleton, California, where they were processed into the United States.

Homecoming
Khiêm got his entire family out, except his youngest brother in the ARVN. He was stationed at Vũng Tàu. After the communists took over, he was sent to a brain-washing camp for two years. On 1 August 1992, he was reunited with Khiêm and his family through the ODP program.

Post-Vietnam career
When Captain Mastronardi found out Khiêm was in America, he sent Khiêm $500 ($2,200+ today). Khiêm and his family then settled in Dayton, Ohio, the birthplace of flight, and home to Wright-Patterson AFB. In the mid-1980s, Khiêm was hired by Piedmont Airlines, (later merged with USAir and now US Airways) and moved to the right seat in only three years.

Another hard landing
On January 30, 1991, Khiêm was flying a Boeing 737 from Raleigh NC to Washington National Airport. Khiêm was approaching the runway but the plane taking off that runway aborted forcing Khiêm to land on runway 33 (a shorter runway). Khiêm realigned to runway 33 and prepared for landing. Runway 33 was even shorter because of the Potomac River on one end and The Pentagon on the other. Khiêm held a steady speed and tried to touch down on the runway at 500 feet instead of 1000 feet. Khiêm dropped 5 knots slamming the nose and wheels on the runway with 87 passengers on board.

Saigon Lady

On April 19, 1985, Khiêm and his family visited Selfridge ANGB to see the plane that brought his family freedom after ten years.

Saigon Lady was transferred to the Smithsonian National Air and Space Museum on January 30, 1989, where it has been for over 28 years until it was transferred to the National Warplane Museum in 2019 for restoration and preparation for public display.

References

Vietnam War
Military personnel of the Vietnam War
1946 births
South Vietnamese people
Living people
South Vietnamese military personnel of the Vietnam War